There was a complicated involvement between Scotland and the Thirty Years' War of 1618–1648. Scotland and the Scots were heavily entangled in both the diplomatic and military events which centred on the Holy Roman Empire. There were a number of reasons for this participation.

Among these, the fate of the Scottish princess Elizabeth of Bohemia (daughter of King James VI & I) proved to be a key concern. Up to 50,000 Scottish troops arrived on the continent having been levied on warrants issued by the Privy Council and countersigned by their king, usually at periods corresponding to the participation of a particular ally in a campaign against the Habsburgs. They mostly served initially in established Scottish brigades in the Dutch Republic and Sweden which had existed before 1618. Later, specially commissioned army groups were also created in Denmark-Norway and France to facilitate further Scottish participation. Some fought for better prospects, some for kin loyalty, others for dynastic and confessional considerations. A few, the minority, were plain mercenaries. Although Scots participated from the start of the war until the end, formal participation by the nation was limited. Scotland formally declared war on Spain (1625–1630) and France (1627–1629), but for the most part, Scots engaged in foreign service with consent from their monarch and under warrants issued by the Privy Council but in armies commanded by their European allies.

Through such service ambitious individual Scots in different European courts had a profound influence on the course of the war both conducting diplomacy and commanding entire army groups in the campaign. These included General Sir James Spens of Wormiston, Lieutenant General Patrick Ruthven, Lieutenant General James King and Field Marshal Alexander Leslie who all served in Sweden. These men were joined in Germany by an auxiliary army with Scots and English under notional Swedish command and led by James, 3rd Marquis Hamilton (1631–1632).

In France the main officers were Marechal de France John Hepburn (1634–1636), a former colonel in Swedish service, and Sir Robert Moray (1640s). In Denmark Robert Maxwell Earl of Nithsdale led a contingent including Donald Mackay Lord Reay and Colonel Robert Monro and Alexander Lindsay, 2nd Lord Spynie among others (1627–1629).

The Scots Brigade, which had existed since 1572, was another outlet for Scottish soldiers looking for service in Continental armies. Although in the service and under the payroll of the States-General of the Dutch Republic, these troops were, first and foremost, loyal to the House of Stuart. Nonetheless, Scottish soldiers may have chosen to serve in the Republic due to their religious beliefs, perhaps as part of movement of "Calvinist Internationalism." Notable officers include Colonel William Brog, William Balfour, James Livingston, 1st Earl of Callendar, and several generations of the Lords and Earls of Buccleuch. Notable engagements during their service in the Eighty Years' War include the Battle of Nieuwpoort (1600), the Siege of Ostend (1601-1604), the War of the Jülich Succession (1609-1610), the Siege of Bergen-op-Zoom (1622), the Siege of 's-Hertogenbosch (1629), and the Siege of Breda (1637), among countless others. 

Not all Scots fought for or believed in the cause of either Elizabeth of Bohemia or the Protestant northern alliances. A number fought for the Habsburgs (Austrian and Spanish) for the same complex reasons as their countrymen; there were some committed to the counter-reformation, some compelled by circumstance and some opportunists such as Albrecht von Wallenstein's assassin, Count Walter Leslie.

Scottish people of the Thirty Years' War

Noted Scots that participated in the Thirty Years' War or had strong interests in it, include:

Scottish monarchs and royalty
 James VI & I –  King of Scotland (1567–1625) & England and Ireland (1603–1625)
 Elizabeth of Bohemia – Daughter of James VI. The Scottish-born princess became Queen of Bohemia after her husband Frederick V of the Palatinate accepted the Bohemian Crown.
 Charles I – Son of James VI. The Scottish-born prince ruled as King of Scotland, England and Ireland, 1625–1649.

Field marshals and generals

Archibald Douglas, lieutenant general of artillery in the Hamilton Army in Germany
 Robert Douglas, Count of Skenninge, eventually elevated to field marshal in the Swedish army (1655), Douglas reached the rank of lieutenant general by the end of the war in 1648. He commanded the left wing of Torstensson's army at Jankowitz
 David Drummond, major general in the Swedish army
 Alexander 'Arvid' Forbes, also known as Finn Forbes, an ethnic Scot and major general in the Swedish army.
 Alexander Hamilton, also known as 'Dear Sandy', General of Artillery in the Swedish army, later General of Artillery in the Army of the Covenant.
 James Hamilton, Marquis of Hamilton (later Duke of Hamilton), "General of British" in the Swedish army in Germany
 John Hepburn, Marechal de France and field marshal in the French army
 Thomas Kerr, major general in the Swedish army
 James King, Lord Eythin, lieutenant-general in the Swedish army in Germany, Governor of Vlotho
Alexander Leslie, Earl of Leven, field marshal in the Swedish army in Germany, Governor of the Baltic Provinces and victor of Wittstock in 1636.
 Robert Maxwell, Earl of Nithsdale, titular 'General of Scots' in the Danish army.
 James MacDouglall, a.k.a. Jacob Duwall, an ethnic Scot and major general in the Swedish army
 James Ramsay 'the Black', major general in the Swedish army.
 John Ruthven, major general in the Swedish army
 Patrick Ruthven, Earl of Forth, field marshal in the Swedish army in Germany, Governor of Ulm
 Robert Scott, General of Artillery in the Danish army.
 James Spens, "General of British", and "General of Scots" in the Swedish army.
 Frances de Traytorrens, general of fortifications in the Swedish army

Some of the more notable Colonels
 William Baillie, later major general in Scotland
 William Balfour, colonel in the Scots-Dutch brigade, later a general in England
William Barclay, colonel in Swedish service, later major general in Sweden (1654)
 William Bonar, colonel and commandant (Glogau, Silesia) in Swedish service
William Brog, colonel in the Scots-Dutch Brigade
Henry (Henry) Bruce, captain in the Scots-Dutch Brigade, colonel and governor in Imperial service
Colonel Robert Cunningham, colonel in Swedish service
 James Douglas colonel in the French army
 Alexander Forbes 'the Bald', colonel in the service of Hessen-Kassel
 William Forbes, colonel of Germans in Swedish service
 Andrew Gray, Catholic and colonel of a "Regiment of Brittanes" in Bohemia
 Herbert Gladstone, colonel in Swedish service
 Alexander Gordon, colonel in the Swedish service
 John Gordon, colonel in Swedish service
 John Gunn, colonel in Swedish service
 William Gunn, colonel in Swedish service, refused promotion higher due to his Catholicism, later a colonel in Imperial service.
 Hugo Hamilton, 1st Baron of Deserf colonel in the Swedish army
 Alexander Hay, colonel in Swedish service
Robert Henderson, colonel in the Scots-Dutch Brigade
 Francis Henderson, colonel in the Scots-Dutch Brigade
 Alexander Irving, colonel in Swedish service
 Frances Johnstone, colonel in Swedish service
 Thomas Kinnemond, colonel in Swedish service
 Patrick Kinnemond, colonel in Swedish service
 Alexander Leslie, 2nd Lord Balgonie, colonel in Swedish service, later colonel in the British Civil Wars
 Alexander Leslie of Auchintoul, colonel in Swedish and Russian service, later first-ever general in Russia (1653)
 George Leslie, colonel in Swedish service
 David Leslie, Lord Newark, colonel in the Swedish army.
 Robert Leslie (brother of Lord Newark), colonel in Hessen-Kassel
 Walter Leslie, Count of the Holy Roman Empire
 Alexander Lindsay, 2nd Lord Spynie, colonel and governor in Danish service
 George Lindsay, Earl of Crawford, colonel in the Swedish army
 Harry Lindsay, colonel in Swedish service
 James Lumsden colonel in Swedish service, later lieutenant general in Scotland
 Donald Mackay, 1st Lord Reay, colonel in Danish and Swedish service
 Robert Monro, major in the Danish army, colonel in the Swedish army, later lieutenant general in Scotland and Ireland
 Robert Moray, colonel in French service and sometime quartermaster general of the Army of the Covenant
 Patrick More, colonel in the Swedish army during the war, later promoted to major general in Swedish service (March 1675) based in Buxtehude near Hamburg
 Robert Munro, Baron of Foulis, colonel in Swedish service
 John Nairn, colonel in Swedish service
 James Ramsay 'the Fair', colonel in Swedish service under Marquis Hamilton.
 William Phillip, colonel in Swedish service
 Andrew Rutherford, 1st Earl of Teviot, colonel in French service, promoted to lieutenant general in 1653
 Frances Ruthven, colonel in Swedish service
 Robert Sanderson, colonel in Swedish service
 Alexander Seaton, colonel in Danish service, later 'admiral' of a fleet in Denmark during the Torstensson War
 Johan Skytte, ethnic Scot and colonel of a Scottish regiment in Sweden
 Robert Stewart, colonel in Swedish service

Important Scottish diplomats
Sir Robert Anstruther, Stuart ambassador to Denmark (and Danish ambassador to Britain), Sweden, the Dutch Republic and the Holy Roman Empire
 William Douglas, Stuart ambassador to Poland-Lithuania and Elizabeth of Bohemia
 James Hay, 1st Earl of Carlisle. Stuart ambassador to France and Spain
 John Henderson, colonel in Swedish service, later Stuart Diplomat to Denmark-Norway and alleged Cromwellian agent.
 Walter Leslie, assassin, Imperial Count and diplomat for the House of Stuart and the Holy Roman Empire
 Hugh Mowatt, agent, spy and later accredited diplomat between Sweden and the Scottish and English parliaments
 Andrew Sinclair, Stuart ambassador to Denmark
 Sir James Spens, Stuart ambassador to Sweden (and Swedish ambassador to Britain), Denmark and the Dutch Republic

Basis for the Covenanter armies
Thousands of Scots returned home from foreign service to join the Covenanters, including experienced leaders like Alexander Leslie and General of Artillery Alexander Hamilton. These veterans played an important role in training the Covenanter recruits. However, more senior officers including Lieutenant General Patrick Ruthven, Lieutenant General James King, Major General John Ruthven also returned to confront their former comrades. Both Covenanters and Royalists returned with cohorts of officers, and both introduced the 'Swedish Discipline' into their respective armies. When the wars spread to England, a situation arose in 1644 where the senior commander of the parliamentary allied army was Alexander Leslie, Earl of Leven while his opposition was led by Patrick Ruthven, now Earl of Forth and Lord General of the Royalist forces in England. Both men survived the war and died peacefully in their beds.

Sources and fiction
Some notable Scottish contemporary published sources
 William Forbes, a diary edited by D. Pleiss, 'Das Kriegstagebuch des schwedischen Offiziers William Forbes: Von seiner Landung an der Unterelbe im Sommer 1634 bis zu seiner Rückkehr nach Stade im Winter 1649/50’, Stader Jahrbuch Neue Folge 85, (1995), pp. 135–53.
 Thomas Kellie, Pallas Armata or Military Instructions for the Learned, The First Part (Edinburgh, 1627).
 Andrew Melvill, edited and published by Torick Ameer-Ali as Memoirs of Sir Andrew Melvill (London, 1918). Only a small part on the Thirty Years' War.
 Robert Monro, His Expedition with a worthy Scots Regiment called Mac-Keyes (2 vols., London, 1637).

Contemporary poetry and fiction
 Arthur Johnston, a contemporary neo-Latinist poet, wrote poems about the Bohemian part of the conflict in W.D. Geddes (ed.) Musa Latina Aberdonensis vol. 1 (Aberdeen Spalding Club, 1892)
 Simplicius Simplicissimus (1668) by Hans Jakob Christoffel von Grimmelshausen, one of the most important German novels of the 17th century, is the comic fictional autobiography of a half-German, half-Scottish peasant turned mercenary who serves under various powers during the war, based on the author's first-hand experience. An opera adaptation by the same name was produced in the 1930s, written by Karl Amadeus Hartmann.

Modern fiction 
 Dallas, O., A Ragged Renown: A Romance of the Thirty Years’ War (1934)
 Dallas, O., The Daughter of the Scots’ Brigade (1938)
 Dickason, C., The King’s Daughter (2010)
 Henty, G.A., The Lion of the North: The adventures of a Scottish lad during the Thirty Years’ War (2 vol., 1997 reprint). Available under sub-title variants including a comic strip.
 Lorimer, J., The Green Brigade (1935)
 Friedrich Schiller's Wallenstein trilogy (1799) is a fictional account of the downfall of this general. Not Scottish as such, but contains fictionalised accounts of Wallenstein's assassins, including Count Walter Leslie.
 Scott, E., The Best Soldier: The Life of Sir John Hepburn, Marshal of France, Founder and First Colonel of the Royal Scots, 1628–1636 (Hawick, 2011)
 Stevenson, J., The Winter Queen (2003)

References

Further reading
 
 Dukes, P., 'The Leslie family in the Swedish period, (1630–5) of the Thirty Years' War', European Studies Review, vol. 12 (1982)
 
 W. Forbes Leith, The Scots Men at Arms and Life Guards in France, 1458–1830 (2 vols., Edinburgh, 1882)
 Edward Furgol, 'Scotland turned Sweden: the Scottish Covenanters and the military revolution’ in J. Morrill, ed., The National Covenant in its British Context 1638–51 (Edinburgh, 1990)
 Alexia Grosjean,‘General Alexander Leslie, The Scottish Covenanters and the Riksråd debates, 1638–1640’, in Macinnes, A. I., T. Riis and F.G. Pedersen, eds., Ships, Guns and Bibles in the North Sea and the Baltic States c.1350–1700 (East Linton, 2000)
 Alexia Grosjean, An Unofficial Alliance: Scotland and Sweden 1569 – 1654 (Leiden, 2003)
 Steve Murdoch, ed., Scotland and the Thirty Years’ War (Leiden, 2001)
 Steve Murdoch, ‘Scotsmen on the Danish-Norwegian Frontier, 1589–1680’ in S. Murdoch and A. Mackillop (eds.), Military Governors and Imperial Frontiers c.1600–1800 (Leiden, 2003)
 Steve Murdoch, Britain, Denmark-Norway and the House of Stuart, 1603–1660 (Eat Linton, 2003)
 Steve Murdoch and Alexia Grosjean, Alexander Leslie and the Scottish Generals of the Thirty Years' War, 1618–1648 (Pickering & Chatto, London, 2014)
 Steve Murdoch and Karthrin Zickermann, 'Bereft of all Human Help?: Scottish Widows of the Thirty Years' War (1618-1648) in Northern Studies, vol. 50 (2019)
 G. A. Sinclair, ‘Scotsmen Serving the Swede’, The Scottish Historical Review, vol. 9 (1912)
 A. F, Steuart, ‘Scottish Officers in Sweden’ in The Scottish Historical Review, vol. 1 (1904)
 David Worthington, Scots in Habsburg Service, 1618–1648 (Leiden, 2003)
 
 Gunnar Westin, ed., Negotiations about church unity 1628–1634; John Durie, Gustavus Adolphus, Axel Oxenstierna (Uppsala, 1932)
 Gunnar Westin, ed., John Durie in Sweden 1636–1638; Documents and Letters (Uppsala, 1936)

17th-century military history of Scotland
 
Thirty Years' War
Thirty Years' War
House of Stuart
Thirty Years' War
Thirty Years' War
Thirty Years' War
Thirty Years' War
Military of Scotland